Hill-Annex Mine State Park is a state park of Minnesota, United States, interpreting the open-pit mining heritage of the Mesabi Range. The park is located north of the city of Calumet, in Itasca County, Minnesota. The park provides access to fossil material exposed by mining from the Cretaceous era Coleraine Formation.

In 1892, the land was leased for mineral exploration. It was leased again in 1900 and mining began in 1913. In the years it was in operation, the mine produced 63 million tons of iron ore. It grew to become the sixth largest producer in Minnesota. Historic buildings include the office building (c. 1930), laboratory (c. 1930), maintenance shop (c. 1930), truck repair shop (c. 1919), wooden water tower (c. 1919), and community club (c. 1915).

After the mine closed, the Iron Range Resources and Rehabilitation Board acquired it for a dollar. They converted the community club building into a museum and visitors center and gave tours. The former mine was listed on the National Register of Historic Places in 1986 as a historic district, and the Minnesota Legislature made Hill Annex Mine a state park two years later.

Flora and fauna 
Conservationists have added vegetation to rehabilitate areas damaged by open-pit mining. The landscape is home to grouse, deer, coyotes, timber wolves, and black bears. Raptors, including eagles, peregrine falcons, and hawks have returned to the park.

Hill Annex Paleontology Project 
The Hill Annex Paleontology Project is a research endeavor focused on the Cretaceous deposits found in Minnesota and has been active at the state park since 2014. It began as a volunteer-led study by the Science Museum of Minnesota. As of 2017, the project is now led by and housed at the Minnesota Discovery Center in Chisholm. This project focuses on the Coleraine Formation, a formation specifically found only in Minnesota.

Many specimens previously undocumented on the Mesabi Iron Range and Minnesota have been uncovered over the course of this project. One of the most scientifically important finds was the end piece of a toe bone from a dromaeosaur in 2015, which is only the second piece of dinosaur remains found in the state. These raptors were approximately five to six feet tall and lived during the Late Cretaceous Period.

Specimens found by this project also ammonites, crocodiles, and various species of fish, sharks, plant material, turtles, crabs, mollusks, snails, and clams.

References

External links

 Hill-Annex Mine State Park
 Hill Annex Mine Paleontology Project
 Hill Annex Mine Fossil Gallery

1988 establishments in Minnesota
Industrial buildings and structures on the National Register of Historic Places in Minnesota
Mining museums in Minnesota
Protected areas established in 1988
Protected areas of Itasca County, Minnesota
State parks of Minnesota
Museums in Itasca County, Minnesota
Mines in Minnesota
National Register of Historic Places in Itasca County, Minnesota
Surface mines in the United States
Iron mines in the United States